The American Israel Public Affairs Committee (AIPAC  ) is a lobbying group that advocates pro-Israel policies to the legislative and executive branches of the United States. One of several pro-Israel lobbying organizations in the United States, AIPAC states that it has over 100,000 members, 17 regional offices, and "a vast pool of donors". Representative Brad Sherman (D-California) has called AIPAC "the single most important organization in promoting the U.S.-Israel alliance". In addition, the organization has been called one of the most powerful lobbying groups in the United States.

Until 2021, AIPAC did not raise funds for political candidates itself; its members raised money for candidates through political action committees unaffiliated with AIPAC and by other means. In late 2021, AIPAC formed its own political action committee. It also announced plans for a Super-PAC, which can spend money on behalf of candidates. Its critics have stated it acts as an agent of the Israeli government with a "stranglehold" on the United States Congress with its power and influence. AIPAC has been accused of being strongly allied with the Likud party of Israel, and the Republican Party in the U.S. An AIPAC spokesman has called this a "malicious mischaracterization". The Washington Post described the perceived differences between AIPAC and J Street: "While both groups call themselves bipartisan, AIPAC has won support from an overwhelming majority of Republican Jews, while J Street is presenting itself as an alternative for Democrats who have grown uncomfortable with both Netanyahu's policies and the conservatives' flocking to AIPAC."

AIPAC describes itself as a bipartisan organization, and the bills for which it lobbies in Congress are always jointly sponsored by both a Democrat and Republican. AIPAC's supporters claim its bipartisan nature can be seen at its yearly policy conference, which in 2016 included both major parties' nominees: Democrat Hillary Clinton and Republican Donald Trump. High-ranking Democrats, including Vice President (later President) Joe Biden and Senator (later Vice President) Kamala Harris have addressed AIPAC, as well as high-ranking Republicans, including Paul Ryan, then-Speaker of the United States House of Representatives.

History
The American Israel Public Affairs Committee, or AIPAC, was founded in 1951 by Isaiah L. Kenen. Kenen originally ran the American Zionist Committee for Public Affairs as a lobbying division of the American Zionist Council. Before that, Kenen was an employee of the Israeli Ministry of Foreign Affairs. According to journalist Connie Bruck, AIPAC was incorporated in 1963 and headed by Kenen until he retired in 1974. Kenen was "an old-fashioned liberal," according to former AIPAC volunteer journalist M.J. Rosenberg, who did not seek to win support by donating to campaigns or otherwise influencing elections, but was willing to "play with the hand that is dealt us."

Michael Oren writes in his book, Power, Faith, and Fantasy: America in the Middle East 1776 to the Present: "Though founded in 1953, AIPAC had only now in the mid-70s, achieved the financial and political clout necessary to sway congressional opinion. Confronted with opposition from both houses of Congress, United States President Gerald Ford rescinded his 'reassessment.'" George Lenczowski notes a similar, mid-1970s timeframe for the rise of AIPAC power: "It [the Jimmy Carter presidency] also coincides with the militant emergence of the American Israel Public Affairs Committee (AIPAC) as a major force in shaping American policy toward the Middle East."

In 1980, Thomas Dine became the executive director of AIPAC, and developed its grassroots campaign. By the late 1980s, AIPAC's board of directors was "dominated" by four successful businessmen—Mayer (Bubba) Mitchell, Edward Levy, Robert Asher, and Larry Weinberg.

AIPAC scored two major victories in the early 1980s that established its image among political candidates as an organization "not to be trifled with" and set the pace for "a staunchly pro-Israel" Congress over the next three decades.   In 1982, activists affiliated with AIPAC in Skokie, Illinois, backed Richard J. Durbin to oust U.S. Representative Paul Findley (R-Illinois), who had shown enthusiasm for PLO leader Yasir Arafat. In 1984, Senator Charles H. Percy (R-Illinois), then-chairman of the Senate Foreign Relations Committee and a supporter of a deal to allow Saudi Arabia to buy sophisticated Airborne early warning and control (AWAC) military planes was defeated by Democrat Paul Simon. Simon was asked by Robert Asher, an AIPAC board member in Chicago, to run against Percy.

In 2005, Lawrence Franklin, a Pentagon analyst pleaded guilty to espionage charges of passing U.S. government secrets to AIPAC policy director Steve J. Rosen and AIPAC senior Iran analyst Keith Weissman, in what is known as the AIPAC espionage scandal. Rosen and Weissman were later fired by AIPAC. In 2009, charges against the former AIPAC employees were dropped.

In February 2019, freshman U.S. Representative Ilhan Omar (D-Minnesota), one of the first two Muslim women (along with Rashida Tlaib) to serve in Congress, created a controversy by tweeting that House Minority Leader Kevin McCarthy's (R-California) support for Israel was “all about the Benjamins” (i.e. about the money). The next day, she clarified that she meant AIPAC. Omar later apologized but also made another statement attacking "political influence in this country that says it is okay to push for allegiance to a foreign country.”  The statements aroused anger among AIPAC supporters, but also vocal support among the progressive wing of the Democratic Party and "revived a fraught debate" in American politics over whether AIPAC has too much influence over American policy in the Middle East, while highlighting the deterioration of some relationships between progressive Democrats and pro-Israel organizations. On March 6, 2019, the Democratic leadership put forth a resolution on the House floor condemning anti-Semitism, which was broadened to condemn bigotry against a wide variety of groups before it passed on March 7.

Aims, activities, size, and successes

AIPAC's stated purpose is to lobby the Congress of the United States on issues and legislation related to Israel. AIPAC regularly meets with members of Congress and holds events where it can share its views.

Size
As of early 2019, AIPAC had 17 regional and satellite offices and a new headquarters on K Street in Washington, D.C. AIPAC spent $3.5 million on lobbying in 2018, a relatively large sum in the realm of foreign policy (more than 10 times J Street's lobbying expenditure), but less than many industry lobby groups, according to OpenSecrets, with the top 15 such groups in the US all spending over $15 million. It has also been noted that, simple dollar value comparisons aside, AIPAC has "a somewhat unique model" that often begins donating early in careers of politicians with "long-term promise". AIPAC also commits to spending on a variety of "less formal means of influence-peddling", such as luxury flights and accommodation for congress members, and surreptitiously channels millions through groups such as the United Democracy Project.

Generating support among policymakers

Thomas Dine developed a network to reach every member of congress. American Jews, the "vital core" of AIPAC membership, made up less than 3% of the U.S. population and was concentrated in only nine states. Today, thousands of AIPAC supporters gather at AIPAC's annual Policy Conference in Washington, D.C. every year. Donors and VIPs are invited to the Leadership Reception on the final night of the conference, which hosts hundreds of members of Congress.

AIPAC has created "caucuses" in every congressional district, with AIPAC staffers organizing every district's Jewish community, regardless of size. Campaign contributions were bundled and distributed to candidates in congressional districts and where they would do some good. According to journalist Connie Bruck, by the end of the 1980s, there were "dozens" of political action committees with no formal relation to AIPAC, but whose leader was often an AIPAC member. The Wall Street Journal reports that in 1987 at least 51 of 80 pro-Israel PACs were operated by AIPAC officials. Some committees that "operate independently" of AIPAC but "whose missions and membership align" with it include the Florida Congressional Committee, NORPAC in New Jersey, To Protect Our Heritage PAC near Chicago, and the Maryland Association for Concerned Citizens near Baltimore.

The Washington Post states that "its Web site, which details how members of Congress voted on AIPAC's key issues, and the AIPAC Insider, a glossy periodical that handicaps close political races, are scrutinized by thousands of potential donors. Pro-Israel interests have contributed $56.8 million in individual, group, and soft money donations to federal candidates and party committees since 1990, according to the non-partisan OpenSecrets. Between the 2000 and the 2004 elections, the 50 members of AIPAC's board donated an average of $72,000 each to campaigns and political action committees." According to Dine, in the 1980s and 1990s contributions from AIPAC members often constituted "roughly 10 to 15% of a typical congressional campaign budget."

AIPAC influences lawmakers in other ways by:
matching an AIPAC member with shared interests to a member of Congress. Sheryl Gay Stolberg calls the system of "key contacts" AIPAC's "secret" and quotes activist Tom Dine as saying that AIPAC's office can call on "five to 15" key contacts for every senator including "standoffish" ones.
carefully curated trips to Israel for legislators and other opinion-makers, all-expenses-paid for by AIPAC's charitable arm, the American Israel Education Foundation. In 2005 alone, more than 100 members of Congress visited Israel, some multiple times.
cultivating student leaders such as student body presidents. At colleges, it provides "political leadership training" to undergraduate student groups. This is an effort to "build a stronger pro-Israel movement among students on and off campuses nationwide."
sympathy for Israel among the general public.

AIPAC has supported loyal incumbents (such as Senator Lowell P. Weicker Jr. (R-Connecticut) even when opposed by Jewish candidates, and the organization has worked to unseat pro-Palestinian incumbents (such as Representative Paul Findley) or candidates perceived to be unsympathetic to Israel (Senator Charles H. Percy). However, a Jewish member of Congress, Representative Jan Schakowsky (D-Illinois), who had maintained good relations with AIPAC and had been given campaign contributions by its members, was opposed by the group in her 2010 reelection campaign after she was endorsed by the advocacy group J Street.

According to former Representative Brian Baird (D-Washington), "Any member of Congress knows that AIPAC is associated indirectly with significant amounts of campaign spending if you're with them, and significant amounts against you if you're not with them." "AIPAC-connected money" amounted to about $200,000 in each of his campaigns for office — "and that's two hundred thousand going your way, versus the other way: a four-hundred-thousand-dollar swing." AIPAC-directed campaign contributions—as with many interest groups—came with considerable "tactical input". AIPAC staffers told Baird and other lawmakers, "No, we don't say it that way, we say it this way." Baird complained, "There's a whole complex semantic code you learn. ... After a while, you find yourself saying and repeating it as if it were fact."

Goals

AIPAC strongly supports substantial U.S. aid to Israel. In March 2009, AIPAC executive director Howard Kohr appeared before the House Committee on Appropriations' Foreign Operations subcommittee and requested that Israel receive $2.775 billion in military aid in fiscal year 2010, as called for in the 2007 Memorandum of Understanding between the U.S. and Israel that allocates $30 billion in aid for Israel over 10 years. Kohr stated that "American assistance to Israel serves vital U.S. national security interests and advances critical U.S. foreign policy goals." The military hardware Israel must purchase to face the increased threat of terrorism and Islamist radicalism is increasingly expensive due to the recent spike in petroleum prices which have enabled countries such as Iran to augment their military budgets, according to Kohr.

Whether AIPAC lobbied for the Iraq War is disputed. Representative Jim Moran (D-Virginia) has stated that AIPAC had been "pushing the [Iraq War] from the beginning." A report in The New Yorker also reported that AIPAC lobbied Congress in favor of the war. However, according to the Jewish News, AIPAC never supported or lobbied for the war in Iraq. According to a columnist at The Washington Post: "Once it was clear that the Bush administration was determined to go to war [in Iraq], AIPAC cheered from the sidelines." Some observers suggested the official silence owed to concerns that linking Israel to the war.

AIPAC's official position on Iran is to encourage a strong diplomatic and economic response coordinated among the United States government, its European allies, Russia, and China.

In 2012, AIPAC called for "crippling" sanctions on Iran in a letter to every member of Congress. In line with this approach, AIPAC has lobbied to levy economic embargoes and increase sanctions on Iran (known as the Nuclear Weapon Free Iran Act of 2013).  However, according to The New York Times, its effort "stalled after stiff resistance from President Obama."

On agriculture and agricultural trade AIPAC lobbies for greater cooperation between the two countries. AIPAC considers agriculture to be a key economic sector for economic cooperation between them.

Successes

AIPAC has been compared to firearms, banking, defense, and energy lobbies as "long" being "a feature of politics in Washington."
Its promotional literature notes that the Leadership Reception during its annual Policy Conference "will be attended by more members of Congress than almost any other event, except for a joint session of Congress or a State of the Union address."
The New York Times has described AIPAC as "a major force in shaping United States policy in the Middle East" that is able to push numerous bills through Congress. "Typically," these "pass by unanimous votes."

A House of Representatives resolution condemning the UN Goldstone Report on human rights violations by Israel in Gaza, for example, passed 344–36 in 2009.

In 1997, Fortune magazine named AIPAC the second-most powerful influence group in Washington, D.C.

AIPAC advises members of Congress about the issues that face today's Middle East, including the dangers of extremism and terrorism. It was an early supporter of the Counter-Terrorism Act of 1995, which resulted in increased FBI resources being committed to fight terrorism.

AIPAC also lobbies for financial aid from the United States to Israel, helping to procure up to $3 billion in aid yearly, making Israel "the largest cumulative recipient of U.S. foreign assistance since World War II." According to the Congressional Research Service (CRS), these include providing aid "as all grant cash transfers, not designated for particular projects, and...transferred as a lump sum in the first month of the fiscal year, instead of in periodic increments. Israel is allowed to spend about one quarter of the military aid for the procurement in Israel of defense articles and services, including research and development, rather than in the United States."

Policy Conference

2016 
In 2016, nearly 20,000 delegates attended the AIPAC Policy Conference; approximately 4,000 of those delegates were American students. For the first time in AIPAC's history, the general sessions of Policy Conference were held in Washington, D.C.'s Verizon Center in order to accommodate the large number of delegates. Keynote speakers included Vice President Joe Biden, former Secretary of State Hillary Clinton, Republican presidential candidate Donald Trump, Governor John Kasich, Senator Ted Cruz, and Speaker Paul Ryan. Israeli Prime Minister Benjamin Netanyahu, who has spoken at AIPAC before in person, addressed Policy Conference via satellite on the final day of the conference. Senator Bernie Sanders chose not to attend the conference.

Prominent officers and supporters
Howard Kohr has been the CEO of AIPAC since 1996, nearly half of its existence, serving with most of its presidents.

Presidents

Supporters
AIPAC has a wide base of supporters both in and outside of Congress.
Support among congressional members includes a majority of members of both the Democratic and Republican Parties. According to AIPAC, the annual Policy Conference is second only to the State of the Union address for the number of Federal officials in attendance at an organized event.

American Israel Education Foundation
The American Israel Education Foundation is a sister organization of AIPAC, that handles educational work, rather than lobbying. It is a 501(c)(3) non-profit educational organization that conducts educational programs, including educational trips to Israel for members of the U.S. Congress and other American politicians.

AIEF trips for members of Congress occur every two years, becoming "the top spender on congressional travel" in those years. In August 2019, the foundation sponsored week-long trips with 72 members of Congress: 41 Democrats and 31 Republicans. They traveled to Israel and the West Bank and visited with Israeli Prime Minister Benjamin Netanyahu and Palestinian Authority President Mahmoud Abbas. Other educational activities include regular seminars for congressional staff.

Critics alleges that these trips are propaganda rather than education and do not tell the Palestinian "side of the story," and that they violate ethics rules prohibiting lobbying groups from gifting personal travel to congresspersons.

Political Action Committee
Until 2021 AIPAC did not raise funds for political candidates itself, but its members raise money for candidates through political action committees unaffiliated with AIPAC and by other means. In late 2021, AIPAC formed its own political action committee. It also announced plans for a Super-PAC, which can spend money on behalf of candidates. In a letter explaining the move, Betsy Berns Korn, AIPAC president, said: "The DC political environment has been undergoing profound change. Hyperpartisanship, high congressional turnover and the exponential growth in the cost of campaigns now dominate the landscape." Dov Waxman, director of the UCLA Y&S Nazarian Center for Israel Studies, said: "Although for decades AIPAC has had informal ties with pro-Israel PACs, it has always refrained from forming its own PAC." He added: "I think its decision to establish its own PAC and super PAC is based on the recognition that campaign funding is a crucial means of exerting political influence in Congress, and that AIPAC now needs this tool in order to maintain its influence in Congress."

Former AIPAC executive director Tom Dine and legislative director Douglas Bloomfield criticized the move, saying it could call the organization's neutrality into question.

In March 2022, the PAC released its first endorsements of 130 candidates for the House of Representatives and the Senate. The list included 37 Congresspersons of the Sedition Caucus who had voted to overturn the 2020 election of Joe Biden. The endorsement drew criticism from a variety of sources. Former U.S. ambassador to Israel Daniel C. Kurtzer said it was "very disappointing that AIPAC has turned a blind eye to the damage that these people have done to our democracy. Their support of Israel cannot ever trump that damage." Conservative pro-Israel columnist Jennifer Rubin called it "truly horrifying".

Aipac's push into the political campaign support comes amid the erosion of bipartisan support for Israel in the US, with opinion polls showing growing criticism for the state among younger Democrats, including American Jews, the breaking of the taboo on comparisons between Israel's treatment of Palestinians and apartheid South Africa, and rising support for the Boycott, Sanctions and Divest (BDS) movement.

United Democracy Project spending

In May 2022, it was also revealed that AIPAC has been spending millions, channeled through surrogate group, the United Democracy Project (UDP), which makes no mention of its creation by AIPAC, to defeat progressive Democrats and particularly female candidates who might potentially align with "the Squad" of progressive Congress members made up of Alexandria Ocasio-Cortez, Ilhan Omar and Rashida Tlaib.

The UDP spent $2.3m in opposition to Summer Lee in the  Pennsylvania Democratic congressional primary race in Pennsylvania. Lee has supported setting conditions for US aid to Israel and accused the country of atrocities in Gaza, comparing Israeli actions to the treatment of young black men in the U.S. The UDP also spent $2m in a North Carolina senate primary to support the incumbent Valeria Foushee against Nida Allam, the first Muslim American woman to hold elected office in North Carolina and the political director for the 2016 presidential campaign of Bernie Sanders. Both candidates are endorsed by the squad.

The UDP spent a further $1.2m to help the Democratic congressman for Texas, Henry Cuellar, face off a challenge from Jessica Cisneros, a 28-year-old immigration lawyer also endorsed by the Squad. Cuellar called Amnesty International "antisemitic" after the release of its report accusing Israel of the crime of apartheid, in agreement with the Human Right Watch and other Israeli and international human rights groups.

J Street spokesperson Logan Bayroff, has called Aipac "a Republican front organisation", a fact that he said they are obfuscating while "trying to persuade Democratic voters who they should support". He added: "The United Democracy Project sounds innocuous ... but the reason that they’re aligning with certain candidates is because they are more aligned with their more hawkish positions on Israel".

Controversy and criticism

Criticism
One critic, former Congressman Brian Baird, who "had admired Israel since I was a kid," but became alienated from AIPAC, argued that
"When key votes are cast, the question on the House floor, troublingly, is often not, 'What is the right thing to do for the United States of America?', but 'How is AIPAC going to score this?'"
He cited a 2009 House resolution he opposed condemning the Goldstone Report on civilian deaths. "When we had the vote, I said, 'We have member after member coming to the floor to vote on a resolution they've never read, about a report they've never seen, in a place they've never been.'"
Baird worries that AIPAC members and supporters believe that they're "supporting Israel" when they are "actually backing policies" such as the killing of civilians in Gaza, "that are antithetical to its highest values and, ultimately, destructive for the country."

A criticism of AIPAC's proposal for tougher sanctions on Iran is that the primary incentive P5+1 negotiators can give Iran to stop its nuclear program is reduction in the sanctions that have harmed Iran's economy. By imposing even harsher sanctions on Iran, AIPAC takes this chip away. According to a "senior" Obama Administration official, the administration told AIPAC leadership that its tougher sanctions on Iran "would blow up the negotiations – the Iranians would walk away from the table." The official asked them, "Why do you know better than we do what strengthens our hand? Nobody involved in the diplomacy thinks that." A former congressional staffer complained to journalist Connie Bruck, "What was striking was how strident the message was," from AIPAC. "'How could you not pass a resolution that tells the President what the outcome of the negotiations has to be?'"

AIPAC has been criticized as being unrepresentative of American Jews who support Israel, and supportive only of right-wing Israeli policy and viewpoints. A PEW center poll found that only 38% of American Jews believe that the Israeli government is sincerely pursuing peace; 44% believe that the construction of new settlements damages Israel's national security.

Among the best-known critical works about AIPAC is The Israel Lobby and U.S. Foreign Policy, by University of Chicago professor John Mearsheimer and Harvard Kennedy School professor Stephen Walt. In the working paper and resulting book, they accuse AIPAC of being "the most powerful and best known" component of a larger pro-Israel lobby that distorts American foreign policy. They write:

"[AIPAC's] success is due to its ability to reward legislators and congressional candidates who support its agenda, and to punish those who challenge it. ... AIPAC makes sure that its friends get strong financial support from the many pro-Israel political action committees. Anyone who is seen as hostile to Israel can be sure that AIPAC will direct campaign contributions to his or her political opponents. ... The bottom line is that AIPAC, a de facto agent for a foreign government, has a stranglehold on Congress, with the result that US policy towards Israel is not debated there, even though that policy has important consequences for the entire world."

AIPAC has also been the subject of criticism by prominent politicians including former Representative Dave Obey of Wisconsin, and former Senator Mike Gravel.

Democratic Congressman Jim Moran from Northern Virginia has been a vocal critic of AIPAC, causing national controversy in 2007 and drawing criticism from many Jewish groups after he told California Jewish magazine Tikkun that AIPAC had been "pushing the [Iraq War] from the beginning," and that, "I don't think they represent the mainstream of American Jewish thinking at all, but because they are so well organized, and their members are extraordinarily powerful – most of them are quite wealthy – they have been able to exert power." AIPAC's membership has been described as "overwhelmingly Democratic" by one conservative columnist (Jennifer Rubin).

In 2020, Democratic Congresswoman Betty McCollum accused AIPAC of hate speech and said the group is a hate group.

In 2020 Senator Bernie Sanders said AIPAC provides a platform for bigotry and said he will not attend their conference. In 2023 (February 19), on CBS Face the Nation,, Sanders said that AIPAC, formerly bipartisan, had evolved towards attempting to "destroy" the American progressive movement.

Controversies
Former Senator William Fulbright, in the 1970s, and former senior CIA official Victor Marchetti, in the 1980s, contended that AIPAC should have registered under the Foreign Agents Registration Act (FARA). FARA requires those who receive funds or act on behalf of a foreign government to register as a foreign agent. However, AIPAC states that the organization is a registered American lobbying group, funded by private donations, and maintains it receives "no financial assistance" from Israel or any other foreign group.

In 2006, Representative Betty McCollum (DFL) of Minnesota demanded an apology from AIPAC, claiming an AIPAC representative had described her vote against the Palestinian Anti-Terrorism Act of 2006 as "support for terrorists." McCollum stated that AIPAC representatives would not be allowed in her office until she received a written apology for the comment. AIPAC disputed McCollum's claim, and McCollum has since declared the incident over.

Steiner resignation
In 1992, AIPAC president David Steiner was forced to resign after he was recorded boasting about his political influence in obtaining aid for Israel. Steiner also claimed that he had "met with (then Bush U.S. Secretary of State) Jim Baker and I cut a deal with him. I got, besides the $3 billion, you know they're looking for the Jewish votes, and I'll tell him whatever he wants to hear ... Besides the $10 billion in loan guarantees which was a fabulous thing, $3 billion in foreign, in military aid, and I got almost a billion dollars in other goodies that people don't even know about." Steiner also claimed to be "negotiating" with the incoming Clinton administration over who Clinton would appoint as Secretary of State and Secretary of the National Security Agency. Steiner stated that AIPAC had "a dozen people in [the Clinton] campaign, in the headquarters... in Little Rock, and they're all going to get big jobs."

New York real estate developer Haim Katz told The Washington Times that he taped the conversation because "as someone Jewish, I am concerned when a small group has a disproportionate power. I think that hurts everyone, including Jews. If David Steiner wants to talk about the incredible, disproportionate clout AIPAC has, the public should know about it."

Spying allegations

In April 2005, AIPAC policy director Steven Rosen and AIPAC senior Iran analyst Keith Weissman were fired by AIPAC amid an FBI investigation into whether they passed classified U.S. information received from Lawrence Franklin on to the government of Israel. They were later indicted for illegally conspiring to gather and disclose classified national security information to Israel.
AIPAC agreed to pay the legal fees for Weissman's defense through appeal if necessary,
but charges were subsequently dropped.

In May 2005, the Justice Department announced that Lawrence Anthony Franklin, a U.S. Air Force Reserves colonel working as a Department of Defense analyst at the Pentagon in the office of Douglas Feith, had been arrested and charged by the FBI with providing classified national defense information to Israel. The six-count criminal complaint identified AIPAC by name and described a luncheon meeting in which, allegedly, Franklin disclosed top-secret information to two AIPAC officials.

Franklin pleaded guilty to passing government secrets to Rosen and Weissman and revealed for the first time that he also gave classified information directly to an Israeli government official in Washington. On January 20, 2006, he was sentenced to 151 months (almost 13 years) in prison and fined $10,000. As part of the plea agreement, Franklin agreed to cooperate in the larger federal investigation. All charges against the former AIPAC employees were dropped in 2009.

Support for 2020 election deniers

After the formation of its first political action committee (PAC) in early March 2022, AIPAC was criticized for backing the election campaigns of 37 Republican members of Congress who voted against certifying Biden's 2020 U.S. presidential election victory after the 2021 United States Capitol attack.

The endorsement of the politicians was described as "morally bankrupt and short-sighted" by Richard Haass, president of the Council on Foreign Relations, while Abe Foxman, former head of the Anti-Defamation League, called it a “sad mistake”, and Dan Kurtzer, a former U.S. ambassador to Israel, urged Aipac to reconsider the move. Halie Soifer, of the Jewish Democratic Council of America, said the move suggested "one must compromise support of America’s democracy to support Israel", which, she noted in an opinion piece published in Haaretz, presents "a patently false dichotomy rejected by the overwhelming majority of American Jews."

AIPAC defended the endorsements by stating that it was "no moment for the pro-Israel movement to become selective about its friends". In a later, "rare rebuke" of the lobby group from within the Israeli government, Alon Tal, a member of the Knesset, criticized the AIPAC endorsements as "outrageous", noting that criticism was important for maintaining what Tal referred to as "a healthy relationship between Israel and American Jewry", according to The Times of Israel.

Financing pro-Israeli Democrats in 2022
While having endorsed over  100 Republican members of Congress who had voted against certifying Joe Biden's election, AIPAC has spent $24 million, via its political action committee, the United Democracy Project, to defeat candidates not considered pro-Israel enough in the primaries of the Democratic Party that select candidates for the 2022 midterm elections. Substantial contributions to this funding have been obtained from Republican Trump campaign financiers such as Paul Singer and Bernie Marcus, together with Haim Saban. It spent $4 million to support Haley Stevens and defeat the Jewish congressman Andy Levin who is known to be critical of AIPAC'S support for hardline Israeli policies. It spent $7  million to defeat the favourite in a Maryland July primary, Donna Edwards, who had failed to back resolutions in support of Israel during its War in Gaza in  2012.  A number of AIPAC supporters assert that reports focusing on AIPAC's campaign funding against candidates critical of Israel's policies are 'antisemitic'.

AIPAC in film
The Israeli documentary film "The Kings of Capitol Hill" features interviews with former and current AIPAC personalities and depicts how AIPAC has moved toward the political right wing and away from political positions most American Jews hold.

See also

 Conference of Presidents of Major American Jewish Organizations
 Zionist Organization of America
 Americans for Peace Now
 JCall
 National Jewish Democratic Council
 Republican Jewish Coalition
 Washington Institute for Near East Policy
 White House Jewish Liaison
 Public diplomacy of Israel

References

Further reading
Kenen, Isaiah (1981). Israel's Defense Line: Her Friends and Foes in Washington. 
Smith, Grant F. (2008). America's Defense Line: The Justice Department's Battle to Register the Israel Lobby as Agents of a Foreign Government. 
Mearsheimer, John J. and Walt, Stephen M. (2007). The Israel Lobby and U.S. Foreign Policy. 
Oren, Michael (2007). Power, Faith, and Fantasy: The United States in the Middle East, 1776 to 2006. 
Petras, James (2006). The Power of Israel in the United States.

External links

 
 

 
501(c)(4) nonprofit organizations
AIPAC
Lobbying organizations in the United States
Organizations established in 1963
AIPAC
Zionist organizations
1963 establishments in the United States
Non-profit organizations based in Washington, D.C.
Pro-Israel political advocacy groups in the United States